Lazica was the Latin name given to the territory of Colchis during the Roman/Byzantine period, from about the 1st century BC.

History 

By the mid-3rd century, Lazica was given partial autonomy within the Roman Empire and developed into kingdom. Throughout much of its existence, it was mainly a Byzantine strategic vassal kingdom that briefly came under Sasanian Persian rule during the Lazic War. The kingdom fell to the Muslim conquest in the 7th century. Lazica in the 8th century successfully repelled the Arab occupation and formed part of the Kingdom of Abkhazia from c. 780, one of the early medieval polities which would converge into the unified kingdom of Georgia in the 11th century.

Ecclesiastical history 
In the early 4th century, the Christian eparchy (eastern bishopric) of Pityus was established in this kingdom, and as in neighboring Iberia Christianity was declared as an official religion in AD 319. Other ancient episcopal sees in Lazica include Rhodopolis, Saesina, and Zygana. Bishop Stratophilus of Pityus was among the participants of the First Council of Nicaea in 325. The first Christian king of Lazica was Gubazes I; in the 5th century, Christianity was made the official religion of Lazica. Later, the nobility and clergy of Lazica switched from the Hellenic ecclesiastic tradition to the Georgian, and Georgian became the language of culture and education. The Bichvinta Cathedral is one of oldest monuments of Georgian Christian architecture. It was constructed by King Bagrat III of Georgia (978-1014, an Orthodox saint).

Rulers

See also 
Roman Georgia
 Laz people

References 

 
Ancient history of Georgia (country)
Provinces of the Sasanian Empire
Roman client kingdoms
Historical regions